Carl Eugen Keel (1885, Altstätten - 1961, Rebstein) was a Swiss painter. He is principally known for his woodcuts, usually portraying town life, and often hand-coloured. He also produced oil paintings, watercolours, wood carvings, lino cuts and wrought iron sculptures. He also lived in Ascona alongside other artists.

References

This article was initially translated from the German Wikipedia.

1885 births
1961 deaths
20th-century Swiss painters
Swiss male painters
20th-century Swiss male artists